Synchiropus lateralis, the Chinese ornate dragonet, is a species of fish in the family Callionymidae, the dragonets. It is native to the South China Sea.

References

lateralis
Fish of the Pacific Ocean
Fish of East Asia
Fish of Taiwan
Taxa named by John Richardson (naturalist)
Fish described in 1844